The Oklahoma Derby is a Grade III American Thoroughbred horse race for three years olds, over a distance of  miles (9 furlongs) on the dirt held annually late September at Remington Park located in Oklahoma City, Oklahoma.  The event currently carries an offered purse of $400,000.

History

The inaugural running of the event was on 18 March 1989 as the Remington Park Derby held over the  miles distance and was won by the Oklahoma bred Clever Trevor in a time 1:43.00. Clever Trevor would later win the Grade I Arlington Classic and Remington Park would have a Black Type Stakes named after him. 

The event was moved to the late summer early fall schedule in 1997. That same year the distance was also increased to  miles. In 1998 the distance was decreased to the current distance of  miles.

In 1999 the event was classified as Grade III and it would hold this status until 2004. From 2005 to 2012 the event was ungraded and in 2013 it regained its Grade III status. 

In 2001 the race was renamed the Oklahoma Derby. It is the track's flagship event and the most lucrative Thoroughbred race at Remington Park.

Records
Speed record:
 miles: 1:48.00 – Classic Cat (1998)  
 miles: 1:42.80 - Dazzling Falls (1995)

Margins:
 10 lengths – Comic Truth (2003)

Most wins by a Jockey:
 3 – M. Clifton Berry (2003, 2006, 2015)
 3 – Garrett Gomez (1993, 1995, 2001)

Most wins by a trainer:
 3 – Donnie Von Hemel (1989, 1991, 2007)
 3 – Brad H. Cox (2019, 2020, 2021)

Most wins by an owner:
 2 – Kenneth and Sarah Ramsey (2010, 2012)

Winners

Notes:

§ Ran as an entry

See also
List of American and Canadian Graded races

References

Horse races in the United States
Graded stakes races in the United States
Grade 3 stakes races in the United States
Flat horse races for three-year-olds
Recurring sporting events established in 1989
Sports in Oklahoma City